Coffee Creek is a stream in the U.S. state of Montana named for its dark waters.

See also
List of rivers of Montana

References

Rivers of Fergus County, Montana
Rivers of Judith Basin County, Montana
Rivers of Montana